United is located in Mount Pleasant Township, Westmoreland County, Pennsylvania, United States. It is a community located near Norvelt.

History

In 1881, the United Coal & Coke Company, organized by a group of Greensburg businessmen, opened the United Mine and Coke Works in Mount Pleasant Township. Served by the Sewickley Branch of the Southwest Pennsylvania Railroad. The United Mine had a shaft entry and employed nearly 200 men and boys. The company constructed houses for its workers and operated a company store. By 1886 United Coke Works contained 300 bee-hive coke ovens. F.M. Reynolds, who served as the initial head of United Coal & Coke Company, was succeeded by William C. Reynolds.

By the end of the 1880s, the H. C. Frick Coke Company had acquired a two-thirds interest in United Coal & Coke Company. H. C. Frick assumed complete control of the United Mine property in 1895. Frick had expanded the United Coke Works to 350 coke ovens, employing 341 men and boys in the mine and coke yard. The company appointed R. E. Laughrey as superintendent at United Mine.

By 1910, however, H. C. Frick Coke Company was operating United Mine & Coke Works in conjunction with the nearby Calumet Mine & Coke Works. Robert Ramsay, a long-time superintendent and engineer at Frick's renowned Shaft Mines near Mount Pleasant, was brought in to manage the United Mine & Coke Works and the Calumet Mine & Coke Works. By this time the population of United had grown to 840 persons.

In 1919 the United Mine produced  of coal, and shipped  of coal. The United Coke Works produced  of coke, with 157 coke ovens in operation. The mine and coke works operated 271 days in 1919, with 315 employees. There were five non-fatal accidents in 1919.

In 1920 the United Mine produced  of coal, and shipped  of coal. The United Coke Works produced  of coke, with 174 coke ovens in operation. The mine and coke works operated 273 days, with 290 employees. There was one fatal accident and one non-fatal accident in 1920.

As with most of the H. C. Frick mines, coal at United was still extracted largely by hand.

The H. C. Frick Coke Company closed and abandoned the United Mine and Coke Works in 1930. The United Mine's tipple was dismantled in 1931. There were 350 bee-hive coke ovens still standing at the United Coke Works when the United Mine closed.

References

External links 
United, PA coal patch town

Pittsburgh metropolitan area
Unincorporated communities in Pennsylvania
Unincorporated communities in Westmoreland County, Pennsylvania
Populated places established in 1881
1881 establishments in Pennsylvania